Mthatha Dam is an earth-fill type dam located on the Mthatha River, near Mthatha, Eastern Cape, South Africa. It was established in 1977 and serves mainly for municipal and industrial purposes. Its hazard potential has been ranked high (3).

See also
List of reservoirs and dams in South Africa
List of rivers of South Africa

References 

 List of South African Dams from the Department of Water Affairs

Dams in South Africa
Dams completed in 1977